"The Voyage" is a very famous modern Irish classic song by the Irish musician, singer-songwriter Johnny Duhan. Unsure of his own vocal capabilities, he offered it to the Irish singer Christy Moore who recorded a version in 1989 that became the definitive and most well-known version of the song. Johnny Duhan went on to record his own version for his similarly titled album The Voyage that was released much later in 2005. The song has been interpreted by a great number of artists and translated into other languages

The idea to write on the family theme grew organically out of Johnny Duhan's earlier excavations of family history. Measuring the early struggles of his own marriage against his parents' rocky relationship, he first wrote a song called "Trying to Get the Balance Right", and this led on to reflections on the whole institution of marriage and child rearing.

"The Voyage" tackles the struggle of marriage and expresses its familial difficulties. Despite his own personal difficulties, Duhan felt he would write in this song about the more positive side of the marriage adventure with deep conviction and sincerity.

He says the chorus of the song came to him out the blue, affecting him tremendously, mainly because he felt that it got to the nub of what family life is ultimately about - the children.

Life is an ocean, love is a boat
In troubled waters it keeps us afloat,
When we started the voyage 
There was just me and you,
Now look around us,
We have our own crew

Christy Moore version
In 1989 , the first of many covers of the song "The Voyage" was made by the Irish singer Christy Moore. Most critics consider it as the definitive version of the song. It certainly remains the most famous version of the song. In the folk section of iTunes download charts, Christy's version has almost had a permanent place in the top ten since the chart was established.

Impact
Ever since Moore's versions, "The Voyage"'s fame remains solid. Politicians, clergymen, writers, journalists and school teachers have eulogised the lyric. Choirs often sing it as part of their repertoire. Comedians gag on it. Marriage counsellors swear by it. 

Music experts note most modern popular songs have a relatively short life span. But "The Voyage" grows more popular with age. Many standard ballads are restricted by national boundaries. But "The Voyage" is sung all over the world in English and in many other languages. 

Niall Stokes of Hot Press magazine has predicted that "The Voyage" will be around long after most popular rock songs are long forgotten. This echoes Christy Moore’s assessment that the song is destined for a high place in the cannon of "folk standards". If "The Voyage" is on its way to becoming a modern classic, as many believe, its intrinsic appeal lies in the affection most of us feel for our families.

Christy Moore stated that "The Voyage" has been performed "at over a million weddings worldwide, not to mention anniversaries, funerals and other occasions".

Other versions

In 2008,  Irish singing group Celtic Thunder recorded a version on their album Celtic Thunder

In 2011, Celtic singer Donna Taggart recorded a version on the album Celtic Lady Vol. 1

In 2014, Irish singer songwriter Lee Matthews recorded a version on his album A Little Bitty Country. Matthews also released an official music video for his interpretation on November 18, 2014.

References

Irish songs
1989 songs